The Dark Eye: Skilltree Saga is a role-playing video game developed by German studio Silent Dreams and published by Headup Games for Microsoft Windows, Android and iOS, and released in December 2014.

Gameplay 
The game is set in the world of The Dark Eye. The Dark Eye: Skilltree Saga uses 2D and 2.5D graphics and involves creating a character and progressing through the story whilst unlocking various abilities in the skill tree.

Reception 
A Gamepressure review criticised the visuals as "low budget", and stated that "[the] storyline and exploration of the world are presented here on boards with static, two-dimensional graphics, while the duels take place in a 2.5D environment". Martin Roger from Eurogamer was also critical of the game's price, narrative, and "limited gameplay".

References

Fantasy video games
Role-playing video games
Video games based on tabletop role-playing games
Windows games
2014 video games
Android (operating system) games
IOS games
Video games developed in Germany
Single-player video games
Headup Games games